Vinod Bharathan is an Indian filmmaker based in Copenhagen. He was educated in filmmaking at film schools in Copenhage.

He is behind the cinematography and editing of most of his films. Limbo, a short film he shot using an iPhone was awarded Best Film at Indie Fone Fest, U.S.A. and Sony Circuito Off, Venice 2012. Karma Cartel which is his debut film had a two-member crew and was shot on HDV using Canon XH A1.

Filmography

References

External links
 

Film directors from Kochi
Film directors from Copenhagen
1969 births
Living people